Edward Victor Barton (1 January 1904 – 13 November 1941) was an English footballer who played as a right half for Everton and Tranmere Rovers.

He was most remember for his long career at Tranmere, making 260 appearances for the club and scoring 5 goals.

Barton later lived in Prenton, Cheshire, and was survived by his wife, Alice Elizabeth. He died in 1941 at only 37 years old, after suffering from an illness for several months.

References

1904 births
1941 deaths
Tranmere Rovers F.C. players
English footballers
Everton F.C. players
Association football wing halves
English Football League players
Footballers from Liverpool
People from West Derby